Charles Adolphus Kiesler (August 14, 1934 – 2002) was an American educator, psychologist and university administrator.  He served as chancellor and 19th chief executive officer of the University of Missouri campus in Columbia, Missouri.  He was also the founding president of the American Psychological Society (now the Association for Psychological Science) and elected to the Institute of Medicine of the National Academy of Sciences.  Before becoming chancellor at the University of Missouri he was provost at Vanderbilt University and dean of the Carnegie Mellon University College of Humanities and Social Sciences.  Kiesler was born in St. Louis, Missouri and held degrees from Michigan State University and Stanford University.  He died in 2002 in San Diego, California.

See also
History of the University of Missouri

References

Leaders of the University of Missouri
People from Columbia, Missouri
People from St. Louis
University of Missouri faculty
Michigan State University alumni
Stanford University alumni
Vanderbilt University faculty
2002 deaths
1934 births
Members of the National Academy of Medicine